Count Konstanty Tyszkiewicz (1806 in Lahojsk – 1868) was a Polish-Lithuanian noble, archaeologist and ethnographer.

He studied the history of Grand Duchy of Lithuania. He was also the brother of Eustachy Tyszkiewicz.

References
 Reda GRIŠKAITĖ,  Konstantinas Tiškevičius ir Neris, arba Kelionė ir Knyga

1806 births
1868 deaths
People from Lahoysk District
Historians of Lithuania
Konstanty
19th-century Polish historians
Lithuanian collectors
19th-century Polish archaeologists
Lithuanian archaeologists
Polish collectors

(